The Diocese of Cametá is a Latin Church ecclesiastical territory or diocese of the Catholic Church in Brazil's Pará state.

Its cathedral is Catedral São João Batista (Sant John the Baptist), and is in the episcopal see of Cametá. The Diocese of Cametá is a suffragan diocese in the ecclesiastical province of the metropolitan Archbishop of Belém do Pará

History 
On November 29, 1952, the Territorial Prelature of Cametá was established on territory split off from the Metropolitan Roman Catholic Archdiocese of Belém do Pará, its present Metropolitan.

On February 6, 2013, Pope Benedict XVI promoted the Territorial Prelature to Diocese, and named its last Prelate, Bishop Jesús María Cizaurre Berdonces, O.A.R., as the first Bishop.

Bishops

Ordinaries
 Territorial Prelates of Cametá 
 Apostolic Administrator Cornélio Veerman, Congregation of the Mission (Lazarists, Vincentians) (C.M.) ( 1953.05.03 – 1961.02.27 see below)
 Bishop-prelate Cornélio Veerman, C.M., Titular Bishop of Numida (1961.02.27 – 1970.11.30) (see above 1961.02.27 – 1969.08.08)
 Bishop-prelate José Elias Chaves Júnior, C.M. (1980.05.21 – 1999.09.29)
 Bishop-prelate Jesús María Cizaurre Berdonces, Augustinian Recollects (O.A.R.) (2000.02.23 – 2013.02.06 see below)

 Bishops of Cametá 
 Bishop Jesús María Cizaurre Berdonces, O.A.R. (see above'' 2013.02.06 - 2016.08.17)
 Bishop José Altevir da Silva, C.S.Sp. (2017.09.27 - 2022.03.09)

Other priest of this diocese who became bishop
José Maria Chaves dos Reis, appointed Bishop of Abaetetuba, Para in 2013

Sources and external links
 GCatholic.org, with incumbent biography links
 Catholic Hierarchy

Roman Catholic dioceses in Brazil
Christian organizations established in 1952
Cameta, Territorial Prelature of
Roman Catholic dioceses and prelatures established in the 20th century
1952 establishments in Brazil